New Jersey's 17th Legislative District is one of 40 in the New Jersey Legislature. As of the 2011 apportionment, the district includes the Middlesex County municipalities of Milltown, New Brunswick, North Brunswick, Piscataway, along with the Somerset County municipality of Franklin Township.

Demographic characteristics
As of the 2020 United States census, the district had a population of 235,376, of whom 188,877 (80.2%) were of voting age. The racial makeup of the district was 71,398 (30.3%) White, 44,522 (18.9%) African American, 1,963 (0.8%) Native American, 57,211 (24.3%) Asian, 113 (0.0%) Pacific Islander, 38,911 (16.5%) from some other race, and 21,258 (9.0%) from two or more races. Hispanic or Latino of any race were 63,076 (26.8%) of the population. 

The district had 149,525 registered voters as of December 1, 2021, of whom 58,590 (39.2%) were registered as Unaffiliated, 70,819 (47.4%) were registered as Democrats, 18,119 (12.1%) were registered as Republicans, and 1,997 (1.3%) were registered to other parties.

Home ownership was high. The district had a large population of Asian Americans, third highest in the state, while having the third-smallest population of senior citizens among the 40 legislative districts. Registered Democrats outnumbered Republicans by a 3 to 1 margin.

Political representation
For the 2022–2023 session, the district is represented in the State Senate by Bob Smith (D, Piscataway) and in the General Assembly by Joseph Danielsen (D, Franklin Township, Somerset County) and Joseph V. Egan (D, New Brunswick).

The legislative district overlaps with New Jersey's 6th and 12th congressional districts.

Apportionment history
Since the 1973 creation of the 40-district legislative map, the 17th District has always been anchored by the city of New Brunswick and Piscataway Township. The 1973 iteration of the district also included Franklin Township and Manville in Somerset County and Highland Park, Middlesex, Dunellen, and South Plainfield. In the 1981 redistricting, the two Somerset County municipalities were shifted to the 14th District while the 17th picked up the Union County city of Plainfield. Dunellen was removed under the 1991 redistricting, but Somerset's Bound Brook was added.

As part of the 2001 apportionment, based on the results of the 2000 United States Census, changes were made which removed Bound Brook (moved to the District 16), Middlesex Borough and Plainfield City (to District 22) and South Plainfield borough (to the District 18) and added Franklin Township (from the 16th Legislative District), Milltown Borough and North Brunswick Township (also from District 18).

Changes to the district made as part of the New Jersey Legislative apportionment in 2011, based on the results of the 2010 Census resulted in the removal of Highland Park (to District 18).

After 20 years in office, John A. Lynch Sr. did not run for re-election in 1977, due to illness. Assembly Speaker William J. Hamilton ran for the vacant Senate seat and Joseph D. Patero and David C. Schwartz were the Democratic candidates for Assembly in a district that voted for Democrats by a 2-1 margin.

After losing the support of the Middlesex County Democratic Organization, Assemblymember Angela L. Perun announced in March 1985 that she had switched parties and would run as a Republican in that year's general election, after having served two terms in office as a Democrat and having been a vocal opponent of the Reagan Administration. Piscataway mayor Bob Smith was given Perun's spot and the Assembly ballot, and he won election together with incumbent David C. Schwartz.

Despite his confidence that he would win re-election if he chose to run, David C. Schwartz decided not to run for re-election in 1991 after seven terms of office, saying that he was reluctant to serve in the minority party in the new legislative term. Jerry Green took Schwartz's open seat in the general Election.

Bob Smith was elected to his first Senate term in November 2001 to fill the seat vacated after Lynch retired. Jerry Green was relocated to the 22nd Legislative District in redistricting following the 2000 United States Census, and the two open Assembly seats were filled by Upendra J. Chivukula and Joseph V. Egan. Chivukula's election made him the first South Asian to be elected to the New Jersey Legislature and the  third Indian American to be elected to a state assembly in the United States.  Joseph Danielsen was sworn into the New Jersey General Assembly on October 16, 2014 to fill the vacant seat of Upendra J. Chivukula, who left office to take a seat as a Commissioner on the New Jersey Board of Public Utilities.

Owing to Middlesex County's strong Democratic leanings, the 17th District has never elected a Republican legislator, only being briefly represented by one when Perun switched parties in 1985.

Election history

Election results

Senate

General Assembly

References

Middlesex County, New Jersey
Somerset County, New Jersey
17